Volodymyr Veredyuk (born April 7, 1993) is a Ukrainian ski jumper.

Performances

External links

1993 births
Living people
Ukrainian male ski jumpers
People from Vorokhta
Sportspeople from Ivano-Frankivsk Oblast